Do-hee, also spelled Do-hui, is a Korean feminine given name. Its meaning differs based on the hanja used to write each syllable of the name. There are 44 hanja with the reading "do" and 24 hanja with the reading "hee" on the South Korean government's list of hanja which may be registered for use in given names.

People with this name include:
Lee Do-hui (born 1971), South Korean sprint canoer
Jenn Im (Korean name Im Do-hee; born 1990), American fashion video blogger
Min Do-hee (born 1994), South Korean singer and actress
Han Do-hee (born 1994), South Korean ice hockey player
Noh Do-hee (born 1995), South Korean short track speed skater

Fictional characters with this name include:
Jin Do-hee, in 2009 South Korean television series Hero
Yoon Do-hee, in 2011 South Korean television series Dangerous Woman
Sung Do-hee, in 2012 South Korean television series Feast of the Gods
Na Do-hee, in 2013 South Korean television series Ugly Alert
Sun Do-hee, in 2014 South Korean film A Girl at My Door
Baek Do-hee, in 2016 South Korean television series The Promise
Woo Do-hee, in 2020 South Korean television series Dinner Mate

See also
List of Korean given names

References

Korean feminine given names